A destructive and deadly tornado outbreak tore through Eastern Alabama and Western Georgia during the afternoon of December 5, 1954. A total of 14 tornadoes were confirmed, 10 of which were significant (F2+), including one that hit Metro Atlanta. Two people were killed, 125 others were injured, and damages total $2.710 million (1954 USD).

Meteorological synopsis
A low-pressure system formed over the Southeastern Colorado and moved southeastward into the Southeastern United States the next day, triggering a severe weather outbreak.

Confirmed tornadoes

Clayton–Howe, Alabama/Lumpkin–Ellaville, Georgia

The first fatal tornado of the outbreak was this strong F2 tornado–which was likely a tornado family–that touched down north of Clayton, Alabama. It headed due east, clipping the northwest side of Eufaula before hitting the town of Howe and moving into Georgia. Throughout Barbour County, Alabama, the tornado injured three and caused $2,500 in damage, although what was damaged in the county is unknown.

The tornado then entered Quitman County, Georgia well to the north of Georgetown and began to curve northeastward. Damage here was mainly limited to trees before the tornado moved into Stewart County, where the worst effects from the tornado were felt. There were no casualties in Quitman County, but there was $250,000 in damage.

Upon entering Stewart County, the tornado hit town of Sanford, where some damage occurred. It then continued northeastward through rural areas before causing some of its worst damage as it tore through the northwest side of Lumpkin in Shady Grove. Several homes and smaller buildings were damaged and a fire lookout tower was toppled. The tornado then moved back into rural areas, continuing to damage or down hundreds of trees before striking Pleasant Valley. A home, church, and several smaller buildings were destroyed while other buildings along trees were damaged. Utility lines were blown down and some crops in storage lost. Throughout the town, one person was killed, three others were injured, losses totaled $15,000. The tornado then struck the town of Red Hill as it passed to the north of Richland with the funnel cloud being observed and a roaring sound like several jet planes in motion were heard. Two homes and a few smaller buildings were demolished, several others were severely damaged, including four automobiles, a tractor, and a trailer, and a large amounts of crops in storage were blown away. There were 16 injures and $35,000 in losses in town. Throughout Stewart County, the tornado killed one, injured 20, and caused $250,000 in damage.

The tornado then entered Webster County, where it turned more to the east and moved through rural areas as it approached the town of Church Hill. It then struck the town as it was moving into Marion County, demolishing one home and heavily damaging several other buildings, including a church. Throughout the town, there were $10,000 in losses and eight people were injured. Hundreds of trees continued to be damage as the tornado continued on its path. Throughout, Webster County, the tornado injured eight and caused $250,000 in damage. An additional $250,000 in damage also occurred in Marion County.

The tornado then moved into Schley County. After moving due east, it abruptly made a left turn northwest of Shiloh and traveled north-northeast, taking it directly into Ellaville. Just outside the latter place, the tornado wrecked five homes. Damage was inflicted throughout the town and dozen of trees were downed before the tornado finally dissipated as it was exiting town. Throughout Schley County, the tornado injured four and caused $500,000 in damage.

Two people were killed and 35 others were injured.

See also
List of North American tornadoes and tornado outbreaks
Tornado outbreak of March 3, 2019

Notes

References

Tornadoes of 1954
Tornadoes in Alabama
Tornadoes in Georgia (U.S. state)
F3 tornadoes